Martin Poglajen (born 28 September 1942) is a Dutch judoka. He competed in the men's middleweight event at the 1972 Summer Olympics.

References

External links
 

1942 births
Living people
Dutch male judoka
Olympic judoka of the Netherlands
Judoka at the 1972 Summer Olympics
Sportspeople from Essen
20th-century Dutch people
21st-century Dutch people